Simon Carroll (1964-2009) was a British studio potter. Carroll has permanent collections at the V&A museum London and Amgueddfa Cymru.

Life
Carroll was born in Hereford and educated at Hereford College of Arts followed by UWE Bristol where he was taught by Mo Jupp and  Walter Keeler. Intrigued by the notion of touch, he became artist in residence at the Royal National College for the Blind in the early 1990s.

A breakthrough show at Tate St Ives, beach drawings and the Arts Foundation Prize, Carroll exhibited, lectured and demonstrated his craft from Hong Kong to the United States gaining international recognition.

Carroll considered Picasso and Matisse important influences and for his Collins Gallery show in Glasgow cited "Staffordshire slipware, Elizabethan ruffles, an American military jacket I saw in a book, three Mexican sombreros and a fish".

Death
Having been diagnosed with liver cancer, Carroll focused on his drawing and died in Hereford in March 2009. Emmanuel Cooper in his Guardian obituary described Carroll as... “one of the more adventurous, fearless and challenging of the younger generation of potters”.

Carroll was survived by his parents and two brothers.

Permanent collections
 Victoria & Albert Museum, London
 Amgueddfa Cymru – National Museum Wales

Selected exhibitions 
 2006 Tate St Ives
 2014 Corvi-Mora
 2014 V&A Museum
 2015 Ruthin Craft Centre

Publications 
 2015: Simon Carroll: Expressionist Potter • ISBN 978-1-905865-69-7

References

External links
Moira Vincentelli (Aberystwyth University School of Art) interview with Simon Carroll

British ceramicists
2009 deaths
1964 births